Phyllocnistis toparcha is a moth of the family Gracillariidae, known from Honshū, Japan, and Tamil Nadu, India. The hostplant for the species is Vitis vinifera.

References

Phyllocnistis
Moths of Asia
Moths of Japan